U.S. Highway 6 (US 6) is a part of the United States Numbered Highway System that travels from Bishop, California, to Provincetown, Massachusetts. In the U.S. state of Colorado, US 6 is an east–west highway stretching from Utah to Nebraska. Much of the route overlaps other highways in Colorado, and, as a result, much of US 6 is unsigned.

Route description

US 6 is concurrent with Interstate 70 (I-70) for a significant portion of its length from the Utah state line to Denver. When the highway enters the western Denver suburbs, US 6 coincidentally aligns with 6th Avenue in the grid system, where it is known as 6th Avenue Freeway. Once it reaches I-25, US 6 travels north briefly, then follows I-76 for most of its length east of Denver. It is unsigned while it is overlapped. It continues down the Clear Creek valley until it reaches I-70, where it is briefly overlapped until I-70 leaves the Clear Creek valley. US 6 continues down Clear Creek and into Denver, where it turns into a freeway with six lanes. East of Denver, it continues east while joined with I-76 until it reaches Sterling, where it diverges from the Interstate. The last town in Colorado through which it passes is Holyoke.

History

Major intersections

References

External links

Colorado Highways: US 6

06
 Colorado
U.S. Route 06 in Colorado
Transportation in Mesa County, Colorado
Transportation in Garfield County, Colorado
Transportation in Eagle County, Colorado
Transportation in Summit County, Colorado
Transportation in Clear Creek County, Colorado
Transportation in Jefferson County, Colorado
Transportation in Denver
Transportation in Adams County, Colorado
Transportation in Weld County, Colorado
Transportation in Morgan County, Colorado
Transportation in Logan County, Colorado
Transportation in Phillips County, Colorado